Johnson Hall is the house built by Colonel Robert Johnson in the Federal style for his new wife in 1806–7.  It is in the historic Market Street of Salem, New Jersey.

The house was left to Col. Johnson's daughter, Anna Hubbell.  It subsequently became the property of the county and was moved when a new courthouse was built on the site.  It is now used as the offices of local organisations including the Chamber of Commerce and Visitor's Center.

References

Salem, New Jersey
Houses completed in 1807
Houses in Salem County, New Jersey
National Register of Historic Places in Salem County, New Jersey
Federal architecture in New Jersey